The 2012 NEAFL season was the second season of the North East Australian Football League (NEAFL).

League structure
The league is split into two divisions called the Northern Conference and the Eastern Conference.

With the admission of Greater Western Sydney to the AFL, the club's NEAFL side became a reserves team and played under the name of University of Western Sydney.

Participating clubs

Regular season

Round 1

Round 2

Round 3

Round 4

Round 5

Round 6

Round 7

Round 8

Round 9

Round 10

Round 11

Round 12

Round 13

Round 14

Round 15

Round 16

Round 17

Round 18

Round 19

Round 20

Round 21

Ladder

Finals series

Week 1

Week 2

Week 3

Week 4

Week 5

Foxtel Cup

Round of 16

Quarter-finals

Semi-finals

Awards
All three polled 14 votes to be judged as the best and fairest players in the Northern Conference of the NEAFL.
He polled 16 votes to be judged as the best and fairest player in the Eastern Conference of the NEAFL.

Best and fairest

Team of the year

Eastern conference

Northern conference

AFL draftees

N – national draft 
R – rookie draft

References

External links
http://www.neafl.com.au/ Official NEAFL website

Australian rules football competition seasons
2012 in Australian rules football